Kif-Kif may refer to:
Kif-Kif (organization), an LGBT rights organization in Spain
Kif-Kif (TV series), a Quebec television series